Chicago XXX is the twentieth studio album, and thirtieth album overall, by the American band Chicago, released on March 21, 2006. It was Chicago's first album of entirely new material since 1991's Twenty 1.

Background
The album was recorded in Nashville, Tennessee with horn sessions in Los Angeles, California over the summer of 2005. Production duties were handled by Jay DeMarcus of the country group Rascal Flatts, who came to the project through a friendship with Chicago's bassist-singer Jason Scheff. DeMarcus used several session players for the album.

Chicago XXX peaked at number 41 in the US during a brief chart stay, spawning minor hits "Feel" and "Love Will Come Back." This would be the last studio recording with long-time vocalist and keyboardist Bill Champlin, as he departed Chicago in August 2009.

Track listing

Personnel

Chicago 
 Robert Lamm – acoustic piano, Wurlitzer electric piano, Hammond B3 organ, vocals, horn arrangements (10)
 Lee Loughnane – trumpet, flugelhorn, piccolo trumpet
 James Pankow – trombone, horn arrangements (2-9, 11-13)
 Walt Parazaider – saxophones, flutes
 Bill Champlin – Hammond B3 organ, acoustic piano, Fender Rhodes, vocals, BGV arrangements
 Jason Scheff – bass guitar, vocals, BGV arrangements
 Tris Imboden – drums (1, 5, 7-13)
 Keith Howland – guitars

Additional musicians 
 Jay DeMarcus – keyboards, guitars, loops, programming, acoustic piano (2), arrangements
 James Matchack – keyboards, loops, sequencing, arrangements
 Tom Bukovac – acoustic guitar, electric guitar
 Dann Huff – guitars (3-5, 7, 9, 11)
 Jack Kincaid – guitars (6)
 Yankton Mingua – guitars (6)
 Dean DeLeo – guitars (12)
 John Brockman – drums (2, 6)
 Steve Brewster – drums (3, 4)
 Lee Thornburg – trumpet
 Joseph Williams – additional backing vocals (2)
 Bobby Kimball – additional backing vocals (3)
 Shelly Fairchild –  lead vocal (4)
 Rascal Flatts (Gary LeVox, Jay DeMarcus and Joe Don Rooney) – guest vocals (5)

Production 
 Produced by Jay DeMarcus
 Production Coordinator – Mike "Frog" Griffith
 Recorded by Jeff Balding, Ben Fowler, James Matchack, Sean Neff and Chas Sanford.
 Assistant Engineers – David Frick Jay Goin, Jed Hackett, Jody Sappington, Aaron Walk and Tony Zeller.
 Tracks #1, 2 & 7-13 mixed by Jeff Balding, assisted by Jed Hackett.
 Tracks #3-6 mixed by James Matchack
 Digital Editing – Jed Hackett and Sean Neff
 Mastered by Bob Ludwig at Gateway Mastering (Portland, ME).
 Photography by Jimmy Katz and Hugh Brown, assisted by Andy Strauss.
 Design by Hugh Brown, assisted by Andy Strauss.

Charts
Album - Billboard (United States)

Singles - Billboard (United States)

References

2006 albums
Chicago (band) albums
Rhino Records albums
Albums produced by Jay DeMarcus